Yuki Bhambri was the defending champion, but did not compete in the Juniors this year.

The boys' singles tournament of the 2010 Australian Open started in the week of 25 January, the second week of the main tournament. Tiago Fernandes won in the final 7–5, 6–3, against Sean Berman.

Seeds

Note: Daniel Berta was, at the end of 2009, ranked world no. 1 among the juniors, but forgot to apply for a place in the tournament; he was given a wild card for the qualification round, through which he qualified for the main tournament.

Draw

Finals

Top half

Section 1

Section 2

Bottom half

Section 3

Section 4

External links
 Main Draw
 Qualifying Draw

Boys' Singles
Australian Open, 2010 Boys' Singles